A Tender-Hearted Crook is a 1913 American drama film featuring Harry Carey.

Cast
 Charles West as James (as Charles H. West)
 Claire McDowell as Edith
 Harry Carey as The Thief
 Hector Dion as The Minister
 Marion Leonard
 Wilfred Lucas

See also
 Harry Carey filmography

External links

1913 films
American silent short films
Biograph Company films
American black-and-white films
1913 drama films
Films directed by Anthony O'Sullivan
1913 short films
Silent American drama films
1910s American films